KBDR (branded as La Ley 100.5 FM) is a regional Mexican format FM radio station that serves the Laredo, Texas, United States and Nuevo Laredo, Tamaulipas, Mexico border area.  The main station broadcasts from Mirando City, Texas with 42 kW power, and a booster station (KBDR-FM1), which is located in Laredo, Texas with a broadcast power of 10 kW.

Transmitter locations
KBDR-FM "Mirando City" Main: 
KBDR-FM1 Laredo Booster:

External links
 

Regional Mexican radio stations in the United States
BDR
BDR
Radio stations established in 2003
Multimedios Radio